Car Warriors may refer to:

Car Warriors (comics), a 1991 comic book series by Epic Comics
Car Warriors (TV series), a 2011 reality television series by Base Productions and Speed